The women's 3000 metres event at the 2008 World Junior Championships in Athletics was held in Bydgoszcz, Poland, at Zawisza Stadium on 12 July.

Medalists

Results

Final
12 July

Participation
According to an unofficial count, 18 athletes from 12 countries participated in the event.

References

3000 metres
Long distance running at the World Athletics U20 Championships
2008 in women's athletics